Monitise Plc was a British company in financial services technology.

Monitise was founded by Alastair Lukies and Steven Atkinson in 2003. Its headquarters are in London, United Kingdom, with operations in the US, Turkey, and Cardiff.

The company listed on the London Stock Exchange's AIM in June 2007. Monitise was named as one of the UK's top 15 fastest growing technology businesses in Deloitte's 2011, 2012 and 2013 Technology Fast 50, and was ranked 3rd in Forbes Most Innovative Growth Companies 2014, making it the highest ranking UK business. In 2016 the company reported heavy losses. Shares in Monitise were down 96 per cent since 2014.

On 9 September 2015, Lee Cameron was appointed as CEO.

After reporting heavy losses during 2016, the company was acquired by Fiserv, a US provider of financial services technology, on 1 September 2017.

History 
Monitise was founded in 2003 by Alastair Lukies and Steven Atkinson, former head of policy at Vodafone. Securing investment for Monitise proved difficult initially until in 2006, the company became part of Morse Plc. During this period that Monitise built a mobile banking, payments and commerce ecosystem.

In 2006 Monitise announced a joint venture with LINK, provider of the UK's ATM network, to develop mobile banking. In October 2006, HSBC and First Direct launched MONILINK, a mobile banking service developed jointly by Monitise and LINK. It offered customers 24-hour access to banking services via their mobile phone, including mini-statements and balance enquiries.

De-merger with Morse 
In June 2007, Monitise demerged from Morse. It listed on the LSE's AIM on 20 June. The de-merger raised £21.4 million in shares sold to investors and other institutions.

2007-2012 
In September 2007, Monitise launched Monitise Americas, a joint venture with Metavante Corporation, a provider of banking and payments technologies to global financial institutions and businesses. To create a mobile banking and payments ecosystem tailored for the North American market, Monitise Americas engineered its platform in order to “deliver a service that is universal in terms of security, access and navigation regardless of the consumer's choice of financial institution or mobile carrier".

On 30 June 2009, Monitise announced that it had entered into a global alliance agreement with Visa International, a subsidiary of Visa Inc., the world's largest retail electronic payments network. Monitise would work as a partner for Visa's mobile services. These included mobile payments, money transfer, transaction alerts and marketing offers.

In 2011, Monitise signed a partnership agreement with Visa Europe to develop and supply mobile payments services for Visa Europe's member banks and financial institutions across Europe.

Further expansion in 2011 included the creation of a technology and R&D hub in Cardiff, Wales.

2012-Present 
On 26 March 2012, Monitise announced its acquisition of Clairmail, the largest third-party for mobile banking solutions in the U.S. At the time of the acquisition, Monitise and Clairmail had 13 million registered consumers across four continents.

Later in 2012, in June and July respectively, Monitise announced partnerships with HSBC and The Co-operative Bank. The three-year mobile banking deal with The Co-operative Bank allows customers to check their balances, access mini statements, and find branches and cashpoints. The HSBC partnership saw Monitise provide support for HSBC's mobile Fast Balance app.

In March 2013, Monitise extended its partnership with VISA Europe in a three-year partnership deal. The deal, which enables VISA Europe to license all of Monitise's mobile money technology, covering three product areas: Bank Anywhere, Pay Anyone and Buy Anything.

In September 2013 Monitise acquired London-based mobile innovation and design agency Grapple Mobile Ltd, which became known as Monitise Create. Later that month, Monitise announced an alliance with IBM's Smarter Commerce initiative to help extend its mobile banking services to VISA Europe.

That year, Monitise was listed in the Deloitte Technology Fast 50 for third year running, with a 2,319%  growth rate.

In February 2014, Monitise acquired Istanbul-based mobile technology specialist Pozitron, listed as one of the top 10 fastest growing businesses in Turkey by Deloitte.  It has since announced partnerships and services with Abu Dhabi-based First Gulf Bank, Yapi Kredi Bank and İşbank in Turkey  .

In March 2014, Monitise and MasterCard announced a commercial agreement to accelerate the development and deployment of mobile wallets and digital payment solutions by financial institutions worldwide. MasterCard also took a minority stake in Monitise as part of a £109million share-placing.

In June 2014, Monitise acquired Markco Media's leading retailer offers, content and discount network, which includes the MyVoucherCodes brand. The acquisition augmented Monitise's Buy Anything mobile commerce product offerings by connecting to a global network of 60,000 brands and retailers.

In 2015, Monitise announced that revenue declined 6% to £89.7m (FY 2014: £95.1m), changes to the board and progress on transition to cloud. Elizabeth Buse stepped down as CEO and from the Board, on 9 September 2015, and deputy CEO and Chief Commercial Officer Lee Cameron was appointed Monitise's new CEO.

In 2016, the company reported heavy losses. Shares in Monitise were down 96 per cent over the past two years. At the start of 2014 its market cap exceeded £1bn, but by May 2016, its market cap had dropped to £66m. An unsuccessful attempt to sell the company's voucher business and management turnover contributed to the decline.

Key People 
Monitise has both an Executive team and a Board of directors.

Executive Team 
Lee Cameron – Chief Executive Officer

Gavin James - Chief Operating Officer

Will Jones – Managing Director, Monitise

Nick Cheetham – Managing Director, FINkit

Fatih Isbecer – President, Americas

Firat Isbecer – Managing Director, MEA

Scott Ewings – Managing Director, Big Radical

Chris Reilly – Managing Director, Content

Tom Spurgeon - Company Secretary

Directors 
Peter Ayliffe – Chairman and Non-Executive Director

Amanda Burton – Senior Independent Non-Executive Director

Tim Wade – Independent Non-Executive Director

Lee Cameron – Chief Executive Officer

Gavin James – Chief Operating Officer

References 

Defunct companies based in London